is a railway station in San'yō-Onoda, Yamaguchi Prefecture, Japan, operated by West Japan Railway Company (JR West).

Lines
Onoda Station is served by the Sanyō Main Line and the Onoda Line.

See also
 List of railway stations in Japan

References

External links
  

Railway stations in Japan opened in 1900
Railway stations in Yamaguchi Prefecture
Sanyō Main Line